City Montessori School (CMS) is a co-educational English medium private school that offers education from Pre-school up to K-12 (Grade 12) level in Lucknow, India. The school was founded in 1959 by Dr. Bharti Gandhi and Dr. Jagdish Gandhi. It is mentioned as world's largest school by Guinness Book of World Records which reported 55,547 students as of 2019.

In 2014, CMS society was accredited with the United Nations Department of Public Information as affiliated NGO.

Background 
Dr. Jagdish Gandhi and his wife Dr. Bharti Gandhi founded the City Montessori School with just 5 children in 1959 in a room at their home. This first campus is now known as the Station Road Branch. Each student is placed in one of the four houses which are Love, Hope, Unity and Peace with the colours Green, Red, Yellow and Blue representing each house respectively. In 2002 CMS was awarded the UNESCO Prize for Peace Education.
The school has also received the 'Hope of Humanity' Award from the Buddhist spiritual leader, Dalai Lama.

Campuses
The campuses of the school are spread all over the city of Lucknow. The campuses include:

 Aliganj Campus I
 Aliganj Campus II
 Anand Nagar Campus
 Asharfabad Campus
 Ayodhya Road Campus
 Chowk Campus
 Gomti Nagar Campus I
 Gomti Nagar Campus II
 Indira Nagar Campus
 Jopling Road Campus
 Kanpur Road (LDA Colony) Campus
 Mahanagar Campus 
 Rajajipuram Campus I
 Rajajipuram Campus II
 Rajajipuram Campus III
 Rajendra Nagar Campus I
 Rajendra Nagar Campus II
 RDSO Campus
 Golf City Campus
 Station Road Campus
 United world campus

Engagements

Model United Nations, the CMSMUN, is organised by the school.

Children of the school have appealed to the world judiciary at International Conference of the Chief Justices of the World.

Various campuses conduct International events annually, like the IYMC, ITMO, Reflections, Confluence, Inter-Faith Harmony Week etc.

Student Quality Circles
The idea of SQCs (Students' Quality Circles) was presented by City Montessori School (CMS) Lucknow India at a conference in Hong Kong in October 1994. It was developed and mentored by two engineers of Indian Railways PC, Bihari and Swami Das, in association with Principal Dr. Kamran of CMS Lucknow India. They were inspired and facilitated by Jagdish Gandhi, who founded CMS after his visit to Japan, where he learned about Kaizen. CMS has continued to conduct international conventions on student quality circles every two years. After seeing its utility, educators from many countries started such circles. The World Council for Total Quality & Excellence in Education was established in 1999. It monitors and facilitates student quality circle activities in its member countries, which number more than a dozen. SQCs are considered to be a co-curricular activity. They have been established in India, Bangladesh, Pakistan, Nepal, Sri Lanka, Turkey, Mauritius, Iran, UK (Kingston University and started in University of Leicester), and USA.

Awards & Recognitions
.

In the news
In 2013, CMS became a center in Uttar Pradesh for the Scholastic Aptitude Test popularly known as SAT, the major test required for admission in US universities SAT.

In 2015, CMS refused admission to 31 students of economically weaker section of the society under the Right of Children to Free and Compulsory Education Act on the grounds that they were ineligible according to the state's own RTE rules. The school's rationale for not admitting the children were that either they were below 6 years of age (definition of child as per RTE act is a person aged between 6–14 years) or they resided beyond 1 km radius of CMS or they had other private schools nearer to their residence than CMS. Ramon Magsaysay Award winner Sandeep Pandey sat on a hunger strike against CMS and other private school's refusal to admit children of economically weaker backgrounds. A meeting was arranged between the city administration, Sandeep Pandey and the school management but the issue remain unsolved reportedly due to either side's refusal to budge from their stand. CMS challenged the DM's order in the Allahabad High Court. Following an interim order by the Supreme Court on school's appeal, CMS admitted 13 children who were found eligible by the apex court.

The activities of the school have made impact during testing times, like in 1992, when the Babri Masjid was demolished and religious riots had cost hundreds of lives. The school also initiated an Indo-Pak children's pen friend's project to promote friendship between children of India and Pakistan.

Following the beheading of Indian army soldier, Lance Naik Hemraj by the Pakistani forces in 2013, and Indian Army responding aggressively to the incident in 2014, tensions were once again high between India & Pakistan. So a Pakistani school's participation in a Cricket tournament conducted by CMS was cancelled.

For the session 2017–18, school management increased the children's fees by 12%. In 2013, it increased its fees for all classes by 10% and for Nursery and Kindergarten classes by up to 16% in comparison to previous year's fee. The school's reputation was challenged when one of its teachers was blamed for slapping a child hard. Reportedly, a student of class 10 at the school's Mahanagar branch committed suicide in 2011, after his principal Nalini Sharad, allegedly, threatened to shame him before the whole school. After the student's suicide, upon his parents insistence, the court took cognizance, rejecting the police enquiry and ordered in 2013 that a case should be registered against Sharad. Nalini Sharad was relieved of her services as Principal of CMS in 2013 when she retired. The matter is sub-judice since then.

The school uniform, including socks and belt were changed by the school management after 33 years. On receiving complaints by guardians who reported that the uniform was being sold at higher prices than the fixed price, the school established a helpline for parents to check the prices. Students have also performed yoga at the United Nations in New York to mark International Day of Yoga on 21 June 2017. Children's films are showcased at the International Children's Film Festival. An international music concert was organised at City Montessori School on 20 April with musicians from 17 countries and 11 states of India ABRSM. There are a number of students from the school who have managed to secure distinction in recent CISCE Examinations.

Notable alumni

 Lucky Ali - singer, actor, songwriter (son of Mehmood)
 Jitesh Singh Deo – actor, entrepreneur, model
 Celina Jaitly – actress
 Urfi Javed – actress
 Brijeshwar Singh – writer

References

External links
 
 Website of City Montessori School (CMS) founder Dr. Jagdish Gandhi

Montessori schools in India
Primary schools in Uttar Pradesh
High schools and secondary schools in Uttar Pradesh
Private schools in Lucknow
Educational institutions established in 1959
1959 establishments in Uttar Pradesh